The Ufa Plateau is a plateau where the city of Ufa is located in Bashkortostan and Sverdlovsk Oblast, Russia. Parts of the Ufa, Yuryuzan River, and Ay River basins are included in the plateau.

Plateaus of Russia
Landforms of Sverdlovsk Oblast